Vanessa Martínez is a Puerto Rican swimmer.

She represented Puerto Rico at the 2003 Pan American Games in the 100 metre and 200 metre butterfly, the 200 metre and 400 metre individual medley and the 200 metre freestyle events.

References
Puerto Rico Herald - Puerto Rico Gears Up For Pan Am Games

Year of birth missing (living people)
Living people
Puerto Rican female swimmers
Swimmers at the 2003 Pan American Games
Pan American Games competitors for Puerto Rico